Aleksa is a Lithuanian-language surname. Notable people with this surname include:

Zigmas Angarietis (1882–1940), Lithuanian communist politician; birth surname Aleksa
, Lithuanian musician, a recipient of the Lithuanian National Prize for Culture and Arts
, minister of agriculture of Lithuania, 1926

See also
Alexa (disambiguation)

Lithuanian-language surnames